Hussain Salman Makki (born 10 December 1982) is a Bahraini footballer currently playing for Al-Riffa of Bahrain and the Bahrain national football team.

He scored the only goal in a friendly against Inter Milan in January 2007 which ended 5–1.

National team career statistics

Goals for senior national team

External links
 
 

1982 births
Living people
Bahraini footballers
Bahrain international footballers
Al-Arabi SC (UAE) players
Al-Wasl F.C. players
UAE Pro League players
Expatriate footballers in the United Arab Emirates
Bahraini expatriate sportspeople in the United Arab Emirates
Footballers at the 2002 Asian Games
UAE First Division League players
Association football midfielders
Asian Games competitors for Bahrain